I Luv My India is an Indian comedy television series, which made its debut in 2012 on SAB TV. It was created by Tony Singh and Deeya Singh's DJ's A Creative Unit and deals with the theme, "What happens when the west meets the east?" highlighting Indian value systems. The public launch function took place at Dilli Haat.

Plot
The story is based on a NRI family which has been far away from Indian culture and India is suddenly forced to come back and adjust to all things Indian. It won't be hard to guess that it would be complete chaos. This is exactly the scenario where the Sethi family, who has been living in London for years, come back to India temporarily and then stay forever, and soon fall into several problems.

Cast

References

External links
 I Luv My India on the SAB TV

Sony SAB original programming
Indian comedy television series
2012 Indian television series debuts
2012 Indian television series endings
Television shows set in Punjab, India